Anatoli Viktorovich Kretov (born 22 July 1976) is a retired Russian football midfielder. He also holds Ukrainian citizenship.

Kretov played in the Ukrainian Premier League with FC Naftovyk-Ukrnafta Okhtyrka.

References 

Graduated from Donetsk Institute of Physical Culture, Sport and Tourism (1998). From 2014 he worked as a children's coach in the Shakhtar Donetsk system [1]. At the same time, he continued to support the form playing for his city's amateur clubs. In 2017 moved to Kiev, where he received a training license and took command of the amateur team of FC "Chaika".

2018, Currently increases the category of coaching license and prepares FC "CHAIKA" team for the second league.

External links
 
 
 

1976 births
Living people
Sportspeople from Makiivka
Association football midfielders
Ukrainian footballers
FC Naftovyk-Ukrnafta Okhtyrka players
Ukrainian Premier League players
Ukrainian First League players
Ukrainian Second League players
Ukrainian Amateur Football Championship players
Ukrainian expatriate footballers
Expatriate footballers in Russia
Expatriate footballers in Finland
FC Yugra Nizhnevartovsk players
Jakobstads BK players
FC Lukhovitsy players
Ukrainian football managers
SC Chaika Petropavlivska Borshchahivka managers
GBK Kokkola players